Cézanne and I (original title: Cézanne et moi) is a 2016 French biographical drama film based on the friendship between 19th century novelist Émile Zola and painter Paul Cézanne. The film was written and directed by Danièle Thompson; it stars Guillaume Canet, Guillaume Gallienne, Alice Pol, Déborah François and Sabine Azéma. It was named as one of four films on the shortlist for the French submission for the Academy Award for Best Foreign Language Film at the  89th Academy Awards.

Cast
 Guillaume Canet as Émile Zola
 Lucien Belves as young Émile Zola
 Guillaume Gallienne as Paul Cézanne
 Hugo Fernandez as young Paul Cézanne
 Alice Pol as Alexandrine Zola
 Déborah François as Hortense Cézanne
 Sabine Azéma as Elisabeth Cézanne
 Gérard Meylan as Louis-Auguste Cézanne
 Isabelle Candelier as Emilie Zola
 Freya Mavor as Jeanne
 Laurent Stocker as Ambroise Vollard
 Pierre Yvon as Baptistin Baille
 Jérémy Nebot as young Baptistin Baille
 Félicien Juttner as Guy de Maupassant
 Flore Babled as Angèle Baille 
 Romain Cottard as Camille Pissarro
 Alexandre Kouchner as Auguste Renoir
 Romain Lancry as Anchille Emperaire
 Nicolas Gob as Édouard Manet
 Christian Hecq as Père Tanguy
 Sophie de Fürst as Berthe
 Patrice Tepasso as Frédéric Bazille

Reception

References

External links
 

2016 films
2016 biographical drama films
2010s French-language films
French biographical drama films
Films set in the 19th century
Biographical films about painters
Biographical films about writers
Films directed by Danièle Thompson
Pathé films
Cultural depictions of Pierre-Auguste Renoir
Cultural depictions of Émile Zola
Paul Cézanne
Cultural depictions of 19th-century painters
2016 drama films
2010s French films